Euxoa sabuletorum is a moth of the family Noctuidae. It is found in southern and eastern Russia.

External links
Fauna Europaea

Euxoa
Moths of Asia
Moths described in 1840